Tulkun may refer to:

Avatar: The Tulkun Rider, the working title for Avatar 4
Tulkun Kasimov (born 1945), Soviet-Uzbek retired military officer